Rakaca is a village in Borsod-Abaúj-Zemplén county, Hungary.

Etymology 
The name comes from Slavic Rakovica (rakъ: crayfish).

References

External links 
 Street map 

Populated places in Borsod-Abaúj-Zemplén County